Bassett is an unincorporated community in Bowie County, in the U.S. state of Texas. According to the Handbook of Texas, the community had a population of 373 in 2000. It is located within the Texarkana metropolitan area.

History
Bassett was named for John Bassett, who bought a plot of land on which the community stands. A post office was established at Bassett in 1882 and remained in operation until 1958, with G.B. Dalby as postmaster. There were two sawmills and 25 residents in Bassett in 1884 and shipped lumber and farming products. The population went up to 100 in 1890, 75 in 1914, and 58 in 1925. There were four businesses in the community and the population was 40 in 1982. From 1990 through 2000, the population jumped to 373.

Geography

Education
Bassett is served by the Simms Independent School District.

References

Unincorporated communities in Bowie County, Texas
Unincorporated communities in Texas